Norman Rosten (January 1, 1913 – March 7, 1995) was an American poet, playwright, and novelist.

Life
Rosten was born to a Polish Jewish family in New York City and grew up in Hurleyville, New York. He was graduated from Brooklyn College and New York University, and the University of Michigan, where he met Arthur Miller. Each won the Avery Hopwood Award.

In 1979, Brooklyn's borough president Howard Golden named Rosten as the poet laureate of Brooklyn.

Among Rosten's work outside the field of poetry, he wrote the libretto for Ezra Laderman's opera Marilyn. He also wrote the screenplay for Sidney Lumet's film Vu du Pont, adapting Miller's A View from the Bridge. He visited Mickey Knox in Rome.

Rosten was a poetry consultant for Simon and Schuster Publishers. It was through that role that he came to know fellow poet Andrew Glaze. The two became friends and Glaze later dedicated his book I am the Jefferson County Courthouse to Rosten.

His work appeared in The New Yorker.

Rosten died in New York City from congestive heart failure on March 7, 1995, at the age of 81.

Awards
 1940 Yale Series of Younger Poets Competition
 1941 Guggenheim Fellowship

Works

Poetry
 Return Again, Traveler, Yale University Press, 1940
 The big road: a narrative poem, Rinehart & Company, Inc., 1946
 Imagine Seeing You Here: a world of poetry, lively and lyrical
 Thrive Upon the Rock, Trident Press, 1965
 
 
 In Guernica

Plays
 First Stop to Heaven,  1941
   (premiere 1956)
 Mardi Gras
 The Golden Door

Novels
 Under the Boardwalk, Prentice-Hall, 1968
 Over and Out, G. Braziller, 1972

Non-fiction
 Marilyn: An Untold Story, New American Library, 1973
 Marilyn among Friends, with photographer Sam Shaw. UK: Bloomsbury (1987)

Anthologies

References

External links
"Audio Interview with Norman Rosten", Wired for Books

 "Norman Rosten", doollee

1913 births
1995 deaths
American opera librettists
Jewish American writers
Brooklyn College alumni
New York University alumni
Writers from Brooklyn
University of Michigan alumni
Yale Younger Poets winners
American people of Polish descent
20th-century American poets
20th-century American dramatists and playwrights
Hopwood Award winners
American male poets
American male dramatists and playwrights
Poets from New York (state)
20th-century American Jews